The 2017 Bahrain FIA Formula 2 round was a pair of motor races held on 15 and 16 April 2017 at the Bahrain International Circuit in Sakhir, Bahrain as part of the FIA Formula 2 Championship. It was the first round of the 2017 FIA Formula 2 Championship and was run in support of the 2017 Bahrain Grand Prix.

Following the 2016 GP2 Series, the championship was renamed the FIA Formula 2 Championship. The feature race was won by Artem Markelov whilst the sprint race was won by rookie Charles Leclerc.

Report

Background 
Other than the name change for the championship, there were some other changes in the off-season which were bound to create an interesting championship for 2017. Both drivers from last year's Prema Racing, Pierre Gasly and Antonio Giovinazzi, left the championship for different championships. Gasly left the championship as the defending champion and subsequently went to race in the Super Formula Championship, having missed out on a drive in Formula One with Scuderia Toro Rosso. Although, he would remain as a reserve driver for the team as well as a test driver for the Red Bull outfit. He later made his Formula One début at the 2017 Malaysian Grand Prix, replacing Daniil Kvyat, then returning for the Mexican Grand Prix to partner New Zealander Brendon Hartley. Meanwhile, Giovinazzi would realize his Formula One dream, driving for Sauber, covering for the injured Pascal Wehrlein in the Australian Grand Prix and the Chinese Grand Prix as well as acting as a reserve driver for Scuderia Ferrari and Sauber F1 Team. In their place would be Ferrari junior drivers Charles Leclerc and Antonio Fuoco. With Leclerc being the reigning GP3 champion and Prema Racing being the champion team from 2016, this was already a hotly-favored combination for the 2017 championship.

Debutants this year also included Alexander Albon, Ralph Boschung, Sérgio Sette Câmara and Nyck de Vries. Albon finished second in the previous years GP3 Series and was a constant front-runner. He would join the ART Grand Prix-outfit, joining McLaren driver, Nobuharu Matsushita. Boschung joins the championship off the back of a moderately-successful GP3 campaign, where he won the sprint race at the Red Bull Ring, driving for Koiranen GP. Joining the Campos Racing-outfit, he would partner a driver with experience in the championship - Stefano Coletti. After spending a couple years away from the championship, Coletti would return for his fifth attempt at the GP2/Formula Two title. Câmara would join MP Motorsport, filling the void left by the departing Oliver Rowland. Câmara had a relatively-successful year in Formula Three achieving third at the Masters of Formula 3 and again at the Macau Grand Prix, as well as a achieving modest results in the European Formula 3 Championship. He would partner Jordan King, who would attempt his third season in the championship. De Vries joined the Rapax team, joining experienced driver, Johnny Cecotto Jr. De Vries is a McLaren junior driver who has had success in the lower formula. Driving for ART Grand Prix in the 2016 GP3 Series season, De Vries became faster as the season progressed and was a regular front-runner throughout the season.

Practice and qualifying 
Oliver Rowland drew first blood in the sole practice session of the weekend, with Artem Markelov in second and rookie-Charles Leclerc in third. Conditions were clear, with the track temperature rising up to 45˚C. The practice session saw the teams mainly focus on race pace and so little movement occurred on the leaderboard.

For qualifying, Charles Leclerc adopted a bold, yet successful strategy to take his first FIA Formula 2 Championship pole position on his debut. Antonio Fuoco was second fastest in the session, however would later be penalised three grid spots after being deemed to have impeded Artem Markelov. This elevated another rookie, Nyck de Vries up into the front row for the first race. During the dying moments of qualifying, drivers were beginning to set some fast times. However, all these efforts would be in vain after contact between Nabil Jeffri and Gustav Malja left both cars stricken on the side of the circuit, bringing out the VSC (Virtual Safety Car) and effectively and end to all qualifying efforts for the evening. As Jeffri approached turn nine, Malja (who was not on a flying lap) went from the outside the inside line, into the path of Jeffri, causing a collision. The stewards deemed Malja to be at fault and subsequently was handed a five-place grid penalty for driving in a potentially dangerous manner and causing a collision.

Other penalties from the qualifying session included Sean Gelael, Sergio Canamasas and Stefano Coletti, all of whom failed to slow sufficiently for the VSC.

Races

Feature Race 
Leclerc leaped off the line, into an early lead with Norman Nato in hot pursuit. De Vries wasted his front row start and dropped down to fourth, while Markelov moved into the top three. After a few laps, Nato's persistence led to a pass into turn one, giving Nato the lead. A couple laps later, Nato's pace started to decline and Leclerc would retake the lead; all the while, Markelov being the watching brief.

Markelov's tyre management paid dividends, passing Nato and closing rapidly on Leclerc as the pitstops started to come into effect. On lap 14, Nato pitted for soft tyres and used the fresh rubber to close the gap to Leclerc, who pitted one lap later. Almost immediately after exiting the pits, Leclerc came under attack from Nato, with the latter taking the lead around the outside of turn four. Markelov then pitted for new tyres, but by now, the gap was extensive and victory seemed unlikely. However, when the race went into the final stages, Leclerc and Nato's pace fell by the wayside, whilst Markelov maintained a strong pace. Markelov passed Leclerc coming out of the final corner on lap 29 and closed on Nato to overtake him as well.

Meanwhile, further down the field, Jordan King passed Oliver Rowland to take fourth place, whilst the battle for sixth saw Alexander Albon pass Nyck de Vries, who by this stage was falling down the order rapidly due to seriously-degraded tyres. Luca Ghiotto and Nobuharu Matsushita finished in seventh and eight respectively, giving both a front row start for the sprint race.

With the tremendous pace and fantastic tyre management, Markelov took the first win of the 2017 FIA Formula 2 Championship and cemented his campaign for the championship.

Sprint Race 
Charles Leclerc won a thrilling sprint race, despite pitting for fresh tyres earlier in the race. The Monegasque driver started from sixth on the grid and promptly drove to the front to grab an early lead. Despite the early lead, Prema decided to adopt a one-stop strategy seeing as how tyre management was an issue for both Prema drivers.

Even before the race started, there was already drama unfolding. Nobuharu Matsushita had to start the race from the pitlane after having failed to leave for the grid in time; leaving the number-one grid slot vacant and giving his teammate, Alexander Albon a clear view into turn one. Albon used this to launch an attack on Luca Ghiotto into turn one, however Ghiotto emerged as the leader. For the second race in succession, there was no accident at the first corner, with all drivers maintaining composure throughout. That was, until after turn four, where contact between Rowland and Nato saw the Frenchman spin off the circuit with a flat right-rear tyre and significant damage to his car. From this point, the race was relatively clean, although intriguing battles initiated throughout the field.

On lap 14, Markelov pitted for fresh rubber, adopting a strategy which was seemingly unnecessary given the exceptional tyre management achieved in the feature race. A lap later, Leclerc pitted as well. This was unexpected as Leclerc was in the lead and was driving away from the second-placed driver, Ghiotto. Leclerc exited the pits ahead of Markelov, but a long way behind the leaders and with a gap that seemed impossible to close. However, as the laps counted down, Leclerc's seemingly impossible attempt at victory became more and more possible. Deducting three seconds out of the gap to the leader per lap, on average, he all of a sudden found himself being behind Rowland and Ghiotto heading into the final lap. Using DRS, Leclerc passed Rowland into turn one and set his sights on Ghiotto for the lead. Ghiotto defended well into turn three, but locked up, handing the lead and eventually, the win to Leclerc. From there, it was a formality with Leclerc taking the win, Ghiotto second and Rowland third.

With this victory, Leclerc left the round in the lead of the championship and whilst Prema didn't leave with the lead of the team's championship, they had clearly demonstrated that they were, once again, the team to beat.

Classifications

Qualifying

Notes
1. – Antonio Fuoco was handed a three-place grid penalty for impeding Artem Markelov during the qualifying session.
2. – Gustav Malja was handed a five-place grid penalty for causing a collision for Nabil Jeffri during the qualifying session.
3. – Sean Gelael, Sergio Canamasas and Stefano Coletti were all handed five-place grid penalties for failing to slow sufficiently for the VSC.

Feature Race 

Notes
1. – Sérgio Sette Câmara was handed a five-second time penalty after stewards deemed him to have forced another driver off the road.

Sprint Race

Championship standings after the round

Drivers' Championship standings

Teams' Championship standings

 Note: Only the top five positions are included for both sets of standings.

References

External links 
 

Bahrain
Sakhir Formula 2
Sakhir Formula 2